is a Japanese voice actress from Tottori Prefecture. She is affiliated with Ken Production. Her husband is fellow voice actor Tsubasa Yonaga.

Filmography

Animation 
 2004
 Sgt. Frog (Upperclassman)
 Samurai Champloo (Customer)
 2005
 Peach Girl (Schoolgirl, entourage)
 2006
 Fighting Beauty Wulong (Richin)
 NANA (Highschool girl)
 Sasami: Magical Girls Club (Toshihiko "Monta" Saruta)
 Ghost Slayers Ayashi (Youngster)
 2007
 Deltora Quest (Pete)
 Romeo × Juliet (Woman in the city)
 Kaze no Stigma (Tooru)
 Neuro - Supernatural Detective (Entourage)
 Mobile Suit Gundam 00 (Diet Member, French Assembly Member, Young Setsuna)
 Ghost Hound (Female student)
 2008 
 Macross Frontier (Female student B)
 Allison & Lillia (First-year student, Matthew)
 To Love-Ru (Big beautiful sister)
 Nabari no Ou (Student)
 Monochrome Factor (Romeo Role)
 Uchi no 3 Shimai (Shōko, A-chan, Ta-kun)
 Clannad After Story (Older brother)
 Kannagi: Crazy Shrine Maidens (Kobu)
 Mobile Suit Gundam 00 Second Season (Young Setsuna)
 Inazuma Eleven (2008-2011)  (Kazemaru Ichirouta, Terakawa Iwao, Tennouji Mari, Yakata Naoto, Kinki Nozomi, Holly Summers,  Eric Purpleton, Azzurro Zaffire, Marco Maseratti, Shinti Hanpa) 
 Stitch! (Koji)
 2009
 Fullmetal Alchemist: Brotherhood (Boy)
 Shangri-La (Young Takehiko)
 Kanamemo (Old woman)
 A Certain Scientific Railgun (Boy)
 Shugo Chara! Party! (Boy)
 Stitch! Itazura Alien no Daibōken (Koji) 
 InuYasha: The Final Act (Kai)
 Natsu no Arashi! Akinai-chū (Yamamoto)
 2010
 The Qwaser of Stigmata (Usagi-chan)
 Beyblade: Metal Masters (Dusty)
 2011
 Inazuma Eleven GO (Kazemaru Ichirouta, Yoshimine Misaki)
 No. 6 (Riko, Young Nezumi)
 Squid Girl (Shota Kuroishi)
 Chihayafuru (Male Elementary Schooler)
 Guilty Crown (Yuu)
 2012
 Inazuma Eleven GO 2: Chrono Stone (Kazemaru Ichirouta)
 2015
 Pocket Monsters: XY&Z (Nihei)
 2016
 Beyblade Burst (Quon Kimidori)
 2018
Inazuma Eleven: Ares no Tenbin (2018 series) (Kazemaru Ichirouta)
Inazuma Eleven: Orion no Kokuin (2018-2019) (Kazemaru Ichirouta)

Films 
 2007
 Nezumi Monogatari - George to Gerald no Bōken (Young Leopold)
 2010
 Mobile Suit Gundam 00 the Movie: A Wakening of the Trailblazer

Video games 
 2008
 Class of Heroes (Female Advocate)
 2009
 Inazuma Eleven 2 (Kazemaru Ichirouta)
 Final Fantasy XIII (Cocoon citizens)
 2010
 Inazuma Eleven 3 (Kazemaru Ichirouta, Azzurro Zaffire) 
 2011
 Inazuma Eleven Strikers (Kazemaru Ichirouta, Doumen Shuuichirou, Kinki Nozomi) 
 Inazuma Eleven GO (Kazemaru Ichirouta)
 Inazuma Eleven Strikers 2012 Xtreme (Kazemaru Ichirouta, Doumen Shuuichirou, Kinki Nozomi, Kiya Kouji) 
 2012
 Guilty Crown Lost Christmas (Yuu)
 Inazuma Eleven GO Strikers 2013 (Kazemaru Ichirouta, Doumen Shuuichirou, Kinki Nozomi, Kiya Kouji, Genius, Marco Maseratti, Shinti Hanpa
 2017
 Yo-kai Watch: Wibble Wobble (Kazemaru Ichirouta)
 2020
 Inazuma Eleven SD (Kazemaru Ichirouta)

References

External links 
 Official agency profile 
 

Living people
Voice actors from Tottori Prefecture
Voice actresses from Tottori Prefecture
Japanese voice actresses
Japanese video game actresses
Year of birth missing (living people)
21st-century Japanese actresses
Ken Production voice actors